Keller-Faszholz Field was a ballpark located in Austin, Texas, and was the home of the Concordia University Tornados baseball team through the 2008 season. The last game at the venue was played on April 19, 2008. It was named after former head coaches Jack Faszholz and James Keller. Nelson Field and Dell Diamond were temporary facilities used by the Concordia baseball team for the 2009 season while their new, state-of-the-art ballpark was being completed in time for the 2010 season.

References

Baseball venues in Greater Austin
Baseball venues in Texas
Concordia Tornados baseball
Defunct college baseball venues in the United States